Rosamond Township is one of seventeen townships in Christian County, Illinois, USA.  As of the 2020 census, its population was 345 and it contained 162 housing units.

Geography

Unincorporated towns
 Rosamond at

Cemeteries
The township contains these three cemeteries: Ohlman, Potters Field and Rosamond Grove.

Major highways
  Illinois Route 16

Demographics
As of the 2020 census there were 345 people, 127 households, and 50 families residing in the township. The racial makeup of the township was 96.23% White, 0.00% African American, 0.00% Native American, 0.29% Asian, 0.00% Pacific Islander, 0.58% from other races, and 2.90% from two or more races. Hispanic or Latino of any race were 0.58% of the population.

There were 127 households, out of which 11.00% had children under the age of 18 living with them, 25.98% were married couples living together, 13.39% had a female householder with no spouse present, and 60.63% were non-families. 60.60% of all households were made up of individuals, and none had someone living alone who was 65 years of age or older. The average household size was 1.83 and the average family size was 3.12.

The township's age distribution consisted of 10.7% under the age of 18, 8.2% from 18 to 24, 15% from 25 to 44, 56.6% from 45 to 64, and 9.4% who were 65 years of age or older. The median age was 56.3 years. For every 100 females, there were 156.0 males. For every 100 females age 18 and over, there were 128.6 males.

The median income for a family in the township was $86,667. Males had a median income of $14,762 versus $40,469 for females. The per capita income for the township was $27,500. No families and 3.0% of the population were below the poverty line.

School districts
 Pana Community Unit School District 8
 Nokomis Community Unit School District 22

Political districts
 State House District 98
 State Senate District 49

References
 
 United States Census Bureau 2009 TIGER/Line Shapefiles
 United States National Atlas

External links
 City-Data.com
 Illinois State Archives
 Township Officials of Illinois

Townships in Christian County, Illinois
Townships in Illinois